Coventry Music Museum (CMM) is a museum, art gallery, music records archive and an interactive media studio located on Walsgrave Road, Ball Hill, Coventry, England.

Overview 
The museum is an independent museum run by unpaid volunteers. It was the vision of music historian Peter Chambers and journalist Julie Chambers, who both serve as directors of the museum today. The museum went into business in 2010. It received £10,000 in funding from the Heritage Lottery in 2015 and has also received grants from the General Charity of the City of Coventry.

Admission to the museum requires the purchase of a ticket, costing £5 for adults, with concessions for other demographics. The Museum received its 5000th visitor in 2015 and its 9000th in 2018.

Collections 
The museum has many collections and exhibitions containing a variety of musical apparatus, most notably from Coventry-born and based musicians and musical groups. These include an exhibition paying tribute to 19th century comedian T.E. Dunville, a 60s sound booth and a permanent display dedicated to Delia Derbyshire. The museum is also home to the entire output of 2-Tone Record, an English record label founded by Jerry Dammers. Every single ever made by the label is available to view.

Paul King, frontman for the 80s band King, paid a visit to the museum in 2011 and attended a special exhibition in tribute to his band. English rock band The Enemy has visited the museum as well. The actual Ghost town Car as seen in the Specials Promotional video for the song is on show here.

References

External links 
 

Museums established in 2011
Museums in Coventry